Carmen Espinoza-Rodriquez (born July 16, 1970 in Muleshoe, Texas) is an American singer-songwriter. She was lead vocalist for twelve years for the musical group Algo Simple before going solo. She is best known for her video America which has been used in PBS documentaries. As an actress, she played the lead role in Texas Legacies for the 2003 season.

Early life
She is one of ten children of Camilo Espinoza, Jr., and Maria Guadalupe Orozco Espinoza. Her first performance was at the age of six with her father, who performed with Bob Wills, Marlon Brando, and The Lennon Sisters. Her love for music and stage grew. In high school, she received the Louis Armstrong Jazz Award for vocals. Carmen attended Texas Tech in Lubbock and West Texas A&M University in Canyon and received her degree in the study of Montessori Education in 1997.

Career
Espinoza-Rodriquez was asked to be the lead vocalist for Hacienda Records artist, Algo Simple. After a twelve-year span with Algo Simple, she decided to go solo. It was at this turning point when she was recommended by CMA Award-winning singer-songwriter Susan Gibson (writer "Wide Open Spaces") to appear on a PBS video documentary. Inspired, she recorded an original composition and shot a video entitled America that has since been featured in two PBS documentaries; Celebrate America! and Southwest Expressions.  Past members of her band include Robin Brannon from the Christian vocal group Acappella (group).

Espinoza-Rodriquez was invited to record and perform as a special guest with the WTAMU Jazz Ensemble. During this time, she was approached to go on tour with Texas X-press, an outreach touring troupe for the outdoor musical drama Texas Legacies.  It was during the tour that she was asked by the executive producer of Texas Legacies to take on the lead role (and was the first minority to be offered a lead role) as Maria Hinojosa' in Texas Legacies. Carmen accepted the role for the 2003 season. Since then, she has shared the stage with country artists including Lee Roy Van Dyke, Steve Wariner, Restless Heart, Holly Dunn, and Michael Martin Murphey.

Honors and awards
 The Amarillo Globe News Golden Nail Award 2003 – Nominee
 Texas Commission of the Arts Texas State Musician Award 2008 – Nominee

Discography

Albums
 Algo Simple – Algo Simple – 1997
 Cumbia Del Sol – Algo Simple – Hacienda Records 2001

Single releases
 "America" – PBS 2002

Compilations
 Gather Around – Algo Simple for The Evelyn Rivers Project 2002

Special guest appearance
 WTAMU Jazz – WTAMU Jazz Band I – WTAMU Records
 Destiny – Gregg Diamond – Papalote Records 2005

Television appearances / video documentaries
 Celebrate America! PBS 2002
 Southwest Expressions PBS 2007

References

External links

 / Official Website

1970 births
Living people
American country singer-songwriters
People from Muleshoe, Texas
Country musicians from Texas
Singer-songwriters from Texas
21st-century American singers